Craterellus fallax is a species of "black trumpets" that occurs in Eastern North America where it replaces the European taxon Craterellus cornucopioides.  C. fallax can also be separated by its yellow-orange spore print, where C. cornucopioides has a white spore print.  It has often been considered a synonym of C. cornucopioides. C. fallax is mycorrhizal, forming associations with Tsuga and Quercus species, among others. 

C. fallax is a choice edible fungus, although is not substantial.

References